The women's snowboard team cross competition of the FIS Freestyle Ski and Snowboarding World Championships 2017 was held at Sierra Nevada, Spain on March 13. 
12 athletes from 5 countries competed.

Elimination round
The following are the results of the elimination round.

Semifinals

Heat 1

Heat 2

Final

Big Final

References

Snowboard team cross, women's